Mina Gogoi (Assamese:মিনা গগৈ), aliases Akoni Gogoi and Binita Bora was a woman sergeant of the 28th Battalion of ULFA, the banned terrorist outfit of Assam. She is the wife of Jitul Bora alias Ramen Dadhumia, the self-styled lance corporal and area commander of the same battalion. She joined the outfit in 1996 and was trained in Bhutan and Myanmar. She is regarded as one of the oldest women cadre of the outfit.

Arrest
On November 26, 2009, the army at Sonari under Charaideo sub division at Namtola-Ladoigarh, arrested Gogoi while she was trying to sneak into Assam from Nagaland where she was taking shelter. The security force recovered 5 kg of Improvised Explosive Device (IED), a .22 pistol, some photographs and a register containing details of funds collected by the outfit in Charaideo subdivision.

See also
List of top leaders of ULFA
Sanjukta Mukti Fouj

References

People from Assam
ULFA members
Living people
Prisoners and detainees from Assam
Year of birth missing (living people)